The Lucknow Cavalry Brigade was a cavalry brigade of the British Indian Army formed in 1911 as a result of the Kitchener Reforms.  It was mobilized as 8th (Lucknow) Cavalry Brigade at the outbreak of the First World War as part of the 1st Indian Cavalry Division and departed for France.  It served on the Western Front with the division until it was broken up in March 1918.

The brigade was reformed in April 1920 and broken up in 1923.

History
The Kitchener Reforms, carried out during Lord Kitchener's tenure as Commander-in-Chief, India (1902–09), completed the unification of the three former Presidency armies, the Punjab Frontier Force, the Hyderabad Contingent and other local forces into one Indian Army.  Kitchener identified the Indian Army's main task as the defence of the North-West Frontier against foreign aggression (particularly Russian expansion into Afghanistan) with internal security relegated to a secondary role.  The Army was organized into divisions and brigades that would act as field formations but also included internal security troops.

The Lucknow Cavalry Brigade was formed in October 1911 as a result of the Kitchener Reforms.  The brigade was one of the last to be formed before the outbreak of the First World War.  It formed part of the 8th (Lucknow) Division in peacetime.

8th (Lucknow) Cavalry Brigade

In September 1914, the brigade was mobilized as the 8th (Lucknow) Cavalry Brigade and assigned to the 1st Indian Cavalry Division.  With the division, it departed Bombay on 16 October 1914 and landed at Marseilles on 7 November.  However, the brigade did not reach the Front until 8–10 December due to horse sickness.  While in France, the brigade was known by its geographical rather than numerical designation so as to avoid confusion with the British 8th Cavalry Brigade also serving on the Western Front at the same time.

Other than the Battle of Cambrai when it helped to hold the German counter-attack, it was not involved in battle. Instead, it was held in reserve in case of a breakthrough, although it did send parties to the trenches on a number of occasions. They would hold the line, or act as Pioneers; such parties were designated as the Lucknow Battalion.

Dissolved
In March 1918, the brigade was broken up in France. The British units (1/1st Queen's Own Yorkshire Dragoons and U Battery, RHA) remained in France, 12th Machine Gun Squadron was broken up on 14 April 1918 and the Indian elements were sent to Egypt.  On 24 April 1918, these were merged with the 8th Mounted Brigade of the Yeomanry Mounted Division. On 22 July 1918 the 8th Mounted Brigade was redesignated as 11th Cavalry Brigade and the division as 4th Cavalry Division.

Post war
The Lucknow Cavalry Brigade was reformed in April 1920.  In September 1920 it was designated as the 4th Indian Cavalry Brigade until 1923 when it was broken up.

Orders of battle

Commanders
The Lucknow Cavalry Brigade / 8th (Lucknow) Cavalry Brigade had the following commanders:

The new Lucknow Cavalry Brigade / 4th Indian Cavalry Brigade was commanded throughout it existence (April 19201923) by Major-General L.C. Jones.

See also

 22nd (Lucknow) Brigade 
 Indian Cavalry Corps order of battle First World War
 Indian Expeditionary Force A

Notes

References

Bibliography

External links
 
 
 

C08
Cavalry brigades of the British Indian Army
Military units and formations established in 1911
Military units and formations disestablished in 1918